In Greek mythology, Leucippus (Ancient Greek: Λεύκιππος Leukippos, "white horse") was a name attributed to multiple characters:

Leucippus (son of Perieres), a Messenian prince and father of the Phoebe, Hilaera and Arsinoe.
Leucippus of Crete, son of Lamprus and Galatea, who was born female and was magically transformed into a man by the goddess Leto.
Leucippus (son of Thurimachus), the son of Thurimachus and king of Sicyon.
Leucippus, the Thespian son of Heracles and Eurytele, daughter of King Thespius of Thespiae. Leucippus and his 49 half-brothers were born of Thespius' daughters who were impregnated by Heracles in one night, for a week or in the course of 50 days while hunting for the Cithaeronian lion. Later on, the hero sent a message to Thespius to keep seven of these sons and send three of them in Thebes while the remaining forty, joined by Iolaus, were dispatched to the island of Sardinia to found a colony.
Leucippus, a Calydonian hunter, son of Hippocoon.
Leucippus, a Pisatian prince as son of King Oenomaus. He was a companion of Daphne, whom he was in love with and tried to approach in the disguise of a fellow nymph of hers. Because of Apollo's jealousy, his disguise was revealed by the nymphs, who killed him instantly upon discovery. This Leucippus might be the one referred to having a wife and a rival Apollo in love.
Leucippus, the son of Poemander who was killed accidentally by his father.

Leucippus, the son of Xanthius who consorted with his own sister and with Leucophrye.
Leucippus, a Lesbian prince and one of the sons of King Macareus, and the leader of a colony at Rhodes
Leucippus, son of Naxos, the eponym of Naxos, and king of the island. His son was Smerdius.
Leucippus, a Cyrenean prince as son of King Eurypylus of Cyrene and Sterope, daughter of Helios. He was the brother of Lycaon.

Notes

References 

 Apollodorus, The Library with an English Translation by Sir James George Frazer, F.B.A., F.R.S. in 2 Volumes, Cambridge, MA, Harvard University Press; London, William Heinemann Ltd. 1921. ISBN 0-674-99135-4. Online version at the Perseus Digital Library. Greek text available from the same website.
 Athenaeus of Naucratis, The Deipnosophists or Banquet of the Learned. London. Henry G. Bohn, York Street, Covent Garden. 1854. Online version at the Perseus Digital Library.
 Athenaeus of Naucratis, Deipnosophistae. Kaibel. In Aedibus B.G. Teubneri. Lipsiae. 1887. Greek text available at the Perseus Digital Library.

Antoninus Liberalis, The Metamorphoses of Antoninus Liberalis translated by Francis Celoria (Routledge 1992). Online version at the Topos Text Project.
 Diodorus Siculus, The Library of History translated by Charles Henry Oldfather. Twelve volumes. Loeb Classical Library. Cambridge, Massachusetts: Harvard University Press; London: William Heinemann, Ltd. 1989. Vol. 3. Books 4.59–8. Online version at Bill Thayer's Web Site
 Diodorus Siculus, Bibliotheca Historica. Vol 1-2. Immanel Bekker. Ludwig Dindorf. Friedrich Vogel. in aedibus B. G. Teubneri. Leipzig. 1888–1890. Greek text available at the Perseus Digital Library.
 Gaius Julius Hyginus, Fabulae from The Myths of Hyginus translated and edited by Mary Grant. University of Kansas Publications in Humanistic Studies. Online version at the Topos Text Project.
 The Homeric Hymns and Homerica with an English Translation by Hugh G. Evelyn-White. Homeric Hymns. Cambridge, MA.,Harvard University Press; London, William Heinemann Ltd. 1914. Online version at the Perseus Digital Library. Greek text available from the same website.
Lucius Mestrius Plutarchus, Moralia with an English Translation by Frank Cole Babbitt. Cambridge, MA. Harvard University Press. London. William Heinemann Ltd. 1936. Online version at the Perseus Digital Library. Greek text available from the same website.
 Parthenius, Love Romances translated by Sir Stephen Gaselee (1882-1943), S. Loeb Classical Library Volume 69. Cambridge, MA. Harvard University Press. 1916.  Online version at the Topos Text Project.
 Parthenius, Erotici Scriptores Graeci, Vol. 1. Rudolf Hercher. in aedibus B. G. Teubneri. Leipzig. 1858. Greek text available at the Perseus Digital Library.

 Pausanias, Description of Greece with an English Translation by W.H.S. Jones, Litt.D., and H.A. Ormerod, M.A., in 4 Volumes. Cambridge, MA, Harvard University Press; London, William Heinemann Ltd. 1918. . Online version at the Perseus Digital Library
 Pausanias, Graeciae Descriptio. 3 vols. Leipzig, Teubner. 1903. Greek text available at the Perseus Digital Library.

 Tzetzes, John, Book of Histories, Book II-IV translated by Gary Berkowitz from the original Greek of T. Kiessling's edition of 1826. Online version at theoi.com

Kings in Greek mythology
Children of Heracles
Heracleidae